George Woodger (3 September 1883 – 6 March 1961) was an English international footballer, who played as an outside left.

Career
Born in Croydon, he signed for Crystal Palace in 1905 from local club Thornton Heath Wednesday, and played a part in their 1–0 away win against Newcastle United in the FA Cup in 1907. In some reports, Woodger was said to have provided the pass that led to the goal that was scored by Horace Astley.

Woodger moved to Oldham Athletic, in September 1910 for a fee of £750 and earned one cap for England in 1911 during his time with the Lancashire club.

References

External links
Woodger at holmesdale.net

1883 births
1961 deaths
English footballers
England international footballers
Oldham Athletic A.F.C. players
English Football League players
Southern Football League players
Crystal Palace F.C. players
Association football forwards
Footballers from Croydon